Immigration to Serbia is the entry of people for permanent residence in the Republic of Serbia. Based on the United Nations report Trends in International Migrant Stock: The 2013 Revision, Serbia had an immigrant population of 532,457 (5.6%).

Most immigrants in the country are from elsewhere in the former Yugoslavia. Many Bosnian and Croatian Serbs came to Serbia as refugees during the Yugoslav Wars of the 1990s. Serbia is also home to smaller numbers of immigrants from various other countries. Regarding the European migrant crisis, Serbia is part of the major transit route in the Balkans.

Notable people
 

Arkady Vyatchanin (born 1984), swimmer, from Russia
Amjad Migati (born 1951), politician, from Jordan
Arno Gujon (born 1985), humanitarian, from France
Timothy John Byford (1941–2014), film director, from England
George Ostrogorsky (1902–1976), historian, from Russia
Francis Mackenzie (1833–1895), Protestant missionary, from Scotland
Flora Sandes (1876–1956), nurse and soldier, from England
Emil Hájek (1886–1974), pianist and composer, from Austria-Hungary
Igor Youskevitch (1912–1994), dancer, from Russia
Archibald Reiss (1875–1929), criminologist, from Germany
 (1811–1875), entrepreneur, from Bohemia
 (1839–1902), merchant and industrialist, from Bohemia
 (1847–1922), musician, from Bohemia
Jovan Valenta (1826–1887), physician, from Prague
 (1811–1900), military, from France
 (1814–1887), publisher, from Bohemia
Maria Fjodorovna Zibold (1849–1939), physician, from Russia
 (1890–1967), footballer, from Prague
Alois Machek (1895–19xx), footballer, from Hradec Králové
František Zach (1807–1892), military, from Moravia
 (1839–1924), statistician, from Bohemia
 (1820–1884), physician, from Bohemia
Eduard Mihel (1864–1915), physician, from Bohemia
 (1912–2007), Partisan and writer
 (1859–1911), compositor, from Bohemia
 (1879–1969), actress, from Bohemia
Vladislav Titelbah (1847–1925), painter, from Bohemia
Eva Haljecka Petković (1870–1947), physician, from Poland
 (1815–1893), physician, from Galicia
Nina Kirsanova (1898–1989), dancer, from Russia

See also
Visa policy of Serbia
Serbian diaspora

References

 
Foreign relations of Serbia